The 1995 Czech Republic motorcycle Grand Prix was the tenth round of the 1995 Grand Prix motorcycle racing season. It took place on 20 August 1995 at the Masaryk Circuit located in Brno, Czech Republic.

500 cc classification

250 cc classification

125 cc classification

References

Czech Republic motorcycle Grand Prix
Czech Republic
Motorcycle Grand Prix